PicturesToExe (PTE) is a photo slideshow software application developed by WnSoft Ltd, and available for Microsoft Windows.

Overview
The software is used to create photo slideshows in executable files for PC and Mac, HD video, on DVD and for exporting on YouTube and Facebook.

The program allows the ordinary user and the professional photographer to create different kinds of slideshows with the option for various transition effects, including 3D effects, comments, backgrounds and sounds. Individual slides can also be customized with animation, such as the Ken Burns effect. The show itself can be synchronized to background music or simply transition randomly from slide to slide.

Creating the slideshow as a self-running executable file allows for the opportunity to password-protect the file, as well as to install security measures such as setting an expiration date or to block the print screen button.

Output
The Standard edition allows the user to create a slideshow as an executable file for Windows and Mac and AVI video file. The Deluxe version also allows HD video (MP4 H.264 file), DVD and to export on YouTube, Facebook, or iPhone/iPad. The quality output of this slideshow program can be said to be excellent for both executable files and video output.

Books
PTE has been featured in more than one how-to book, including the French-language publications Diaporama Numérique by Patricia Ondina, and  Réaliser des diaporamas numériques avec PicturesToExe. Version 6.5. France, 2010.

See also
 Slideshow
 Photo slideshow software
 Ken Burns effect

References

External links
 PicturesToExe's official website

Photo software
Presentation